Ki Smith Gallery is an art gallery in the East Village of New York City.

History
Ki Smith opened Ki Smith Gallery in 2018 with an inaugural event in collaboration with Ryan Bock titled the Bock Brick Benefit. Many of the original artists working with Ki Smith Gallery were also associated with Smith’s previous gallery and underground nightclub (Apostrophe NYC) which he ran from 2012 to 2018. The gallery was best known for its guerilla art exhibitions at the Whitney Museum and MoMA PS1.

In 2019, Smith also opened Ki Smith Gallery's first brick and mortar location in an empty retail space at 712 W 125th Street in Harlem which was donated by David and Pernilla Avital of MTP Invest, for two years where they showcased their represented artists and developed a publication program. Later in 2019, Ki Smith enlisted the rights coordinator of MoMA's publication department, Naomi Falk (also of Archway Editions) to help cofound Ki Smith Gallery's editorial department.  Contributing writers for publications include Chris Molnar and Bob Holman. In 2020, the Gallery moved downtown to open 197 East 4th Street, and in 2021 expanded, creating a second location at  311 E 3rd Street. In 2021 they collaborated with the Arte Laguna Prize as part of their "Artist in Gallery" special prize.

Artists
The gallery has exhibited artists including:
 Ryan Bock
 Caslon Bevington
 Charlie Hudson
 Bruno Smith
 James Reyes
 Luke Ivy Price
 The Love Child
 David Burnett
 Jill Freedman
 Angelica Yudasto
 Sono Kuwayama
 Kiyomi Quinn Taylor
 Ari Marcopoulos
 Jonas Mekas
 Michael Stipe

References

External links

Artforum guide to Ki Smith Gallery

Contemporary art galleries in the United States
2019 establishments in New York City
Art museums and galleries in Manhattan
Art museums and galleries in New York City
Lower East Side